Baby Come Back may refer to:

 "Baby Come Back", a 1957 song by Johnny Rivers
 "Santa Bring My Baby Back (To Me)", a Christmas-themed rewrite of the Johnny Rivers song, made popular by Elvis Presley
 "Baby, Come Back" (The Equals song), 1967
 Baby, Come Back (album), 1968 album by The Equals
 "Baby Come Back" (Player song), a 1977 song
 "Baby Come Back", a 1984 song by Billy Rankin from the album Growin' Up Too Fast
 "Baby Come Back", a 1995 song by Worlds Apart
 "Baby Come Back," a 2000 songs from Casino by Alcaza

See also
 Come Back Baby (disambiguation)